The Catholic Church in Honduras is part of the worldwide Catholic Church, under the spiritual leadership of the Pope in Rome.

There are over four million Catholics in Honduras - around three quarters of the total population. The country is divided into eight dioceses, including one archdiocese. According to the Latinobarómetro in 2018, 37% of the country is Catholic, 39% Protestant, 21% Unaffiliated and 3% Others.

See also 
 Episcopal Conference of Honduras
 List of Catholic dioceses in Honduras
 List of Central American and Caribbean Saints
 Religion in Honduras
 Roman Catholic Archdiocese of Tegucigalpa

References 

 
Honduras